This is a list of notable automobile manufacturers with articles on Wikipedia by country. It is a subset of the list of automobile manufacturers for manufacturers based in Canada. It includes companies that are in business as well as defunct manufacturers.

Manufacturers 
Campagna (1988)
Canadian Electric Vehicles (1996)
Fiat Chrysler Canada (1925)
Ford Canada (1904)
General Motors Canada (1918)
CAMI (1986)
GreenPower (2007)
Girardin Minibus (1935)
Grande West (2008)
Honda Canada (1969)
HTT Automobile (2007)
Lion Bus (2011)
New Flyer (1930)
Nova Bus (1993)
Prevost (1924)
TAV (-)
Timmis (1968)
Toyota Canada (1964)

References

See also
 List of automobile manufacturers
 List of automobile marques

Lists of automobile manufacturers

uk:Список автовиробників Канади